George Piranian (May 2, 1914 – August 31, 2009) was a Swiss-American mathematician. Piranian was internationally known for his research in complex analysis, his association with Paul Erdős, and his editing of the Michigan Mathematical Journal.

Early life

Piranian was born in Thalwil outside Zürich, Switzerland. His father, Patvakan Piranian, was originally from Armenia. George and his brother David at home were called Gevorg and Davit, the Armenian versions of their names. His family immigrated to Logan, Utah (1929) where Piranian received a B.Sc. in agriculture and M.Sc. in botany (1937) at Utah State University. As a Rhodes scholar, Piranian first "tasted blood" in mathematics at Oxford.

After returning to the United States, Piranian earned his Ph.D. in mathematics under Szolem Mandelbrojt at Rice University (1943). Piranian's dissertation was entitled A Study of the Position and Nature of the Singularities of Functions Given by Their Taylor Series.

Piranian joined the faculty at University of Michigan in 1945.

Editing the Michigan Mathematical Journal

In 1952, Piranian, along with Paul Erdős, Fritz Herzog and Arthur J. Lohwater, founded the Michigan Mathematical Journal; leadership in editing was assumed by Piranian in 1954. Piranian co-authored a research paper with Erdős and Herzog; as a consequence he has an Erdős number of one.

Piranian's editing was renowned in mathematics.

Teaching
Piranian's teaching captivated several future research mathematicians. Piranian also was an advisor with the Honors Program at the College of Literature, Science and the Arts at the University of Michigan.

Teaching of Theodore Kaczynski
In the 1960s, Piranian taught and advised Theodore Kaczynski, who was a Ph.D. student in mathematics. In the 1990s, Kaczynski was convicted of the Unabomber crimes.

References

Mathematical analysts
University of Michigan faculty
20th-century American mathematicians
21st-century American mathematicians
Mathematics educators
American print editors
American Rhodes Scholars
Swiss emigrants to the United States
Utah State University alumni
Rice University alumni
People from Thalwil
American people of Swiss-German descent
American people of Armenian descent
1914 births
2009 deaths
People from Ann Arbor, Michigan
Academic journal editors
Scientists from Logan, Utah
Complex analysts